Crooked Intention is a historic home in St. Michaels, Talbot County, Maryland, United States. It is a -story brick dwelling, three bays wide with wings, built about 1753.  A -story Flemish bond wing was added in 1956. Also on the property is the original brick smokehouse and a beaded clapboard dairy.

Crooked Intention was listed on the National Register of Historic Places in 1974.

References

External links
, including photo from 1998, at Maryland Historical Trust

Houses in Talbot County, Maryland
Houses on the National Register of Historic Places in Maryland
Houses completed in 1753
National Register of Historic Places in Talbot County, Maryland